Jerejak Island is an islet off the eastern coast of Penang Island in the State of Penang, Malaysia. Located within the Northeast Penang Island District, it is also a short ferry ride from the town of Bayan Lepas near the southeastern tip of Penang Island. It was formerly the main leper asylum for the Straits Settlements (1868), a Quarantine Station (1875) and a penal colony (1969).

History
 

Francis Light, the founder of Penang, was said to have arrived in Jerejak Island in early 1786 before heading on to Penang. In 1797, Colonel Arthur Wellesley had proposed Jerejak as the possible site for Fort Cornwallis. His idea of establishing a military post in Jerejak was to offer protection to a new township called Jamestown, which was to be set up in present-day Bayan Lepas. Earlier in 1794, there had been an outbreak of malaria caused most likely by the clearing of the jungle to establish George Town, claiming many lives, including Francis Light himself. Thus, Wellesley was not in favour of the site for Fort Cornwallis to be on Penang island.

This plan did not materialise as George Town was starting to become a profitable port and it soon became unnecessary to establish Jamestown or have a military facility in that location.

As a result of Francis Light's earlier ruling whereby immigrants were allowed to claim whatever land they could clear, Penang became flooded with immigrants. As a precautionary step, these immigrants were sent to Jerejak's health inspection centre before they were allowed to proceed to Penang.

In 1868, a leper asylum was completed and then began use in 1871. The cost of construction was supported by the local community. In 1880, it was expanded becoming the collection centre of leprosy (leprosarium) for the Straits Settlements until the 1930s. The leprosarium was closed in the 1960s and the inmates were transferred to Sungai Buloh Leper Settlement/Leprosarium. Part of the island were made into a health quarantine centre for immigrants in 1875 at the eastern and northern parts of the island.

A memorial is located at the island dedicated to two crew members of the Imperial Russian Navy who died when their cruiser  was sunk by the cruiser  of the Kaiserliche Marine in the Battle of Penang on 28 October 1914. This is one of the few incidences of action which took place in Malaysian territory during World War I.

After World War II, there was an increase in the number of tuberculosis patients and a sanatorium was set up at Jerejak for victims. On 12 June 1969, the Jerejak Rehabilitation Centre was set up as a maximum security prison, hence earning the island the moniker, the Alcatraz of Malaysia. The centre was eventually closed in August 1993.

Transportation 

Jerejak Island is situated on a 362 ha island, just 10 minutes away from the hustle & bustle of Penang Island, west coast of Peninsular Malaysia. From there, take a 5 minute ferry ride to Jerejak Island. Ferry ticket must be purchased from the ticket counter at the jetty. RM25 per adult and RM16 per child (two way transfer).

Current Developments 
Plans were made to redevelop Jerejak into a resort in 2000 and this resulted in the closure of the more "unsavoury" institutions on the island like the sanatorium and prison. In January 2004, the Jerejak Resort & Spa was opened for business. The resort was built over the area once occupied by the leprosarium.

This development remains somewhat controversial, with concerns about the systematic removal of the island's historical remains and heritage  and the impact on Jerejak's fragile eco-system.

See also 
 List of islands of Malaysia

References

Islands of Penang
Leper colonies
Medical and health organisations based in Malaysia
Prison islands